2 The Shambles is an historic building in the English city of York, North Yorkshire. A Grade II listed building, part of the structure dates to the early 18th century, with alteration occurring in the early and mid-19th century, including the addition of a shopfront. The building was modernised around 1970.

Its bricks are in Flemish bond, while the shopfront is made of timber. The windows on the upper floors are in three sections.

As of 2023, the building is occupied by Roly's Fudge Pantry.

References 

2
Houses in North Yorkshire
18th-century establishments in England
Grade II listed buildings in York
Grade II listed houses
18th century in York